Goonown is a hamlet near St Agnes in Cornwall, England, UK. There is a Methodist chapel and a 19th-century graveyard in Goonown.

References

Hamlets in Cornwall